The Texas World War II Memorial is an outdoor monument commemorating the more than 20,000 Texans who died in service during World War II, installed on the Texas State Capitol grounds in Austin, Texas, United States.

Description and history
The memorial, a replica of the state's pillar at the National World War II Memorial in Washington, D.C., was by designed by an unknown artist and erected by the Texas World War II Memorial Committee and Texas State Preservation Board in 2007. It features a  granite column with a bronze oak and wheat wreath.

See also
 2007 in art

References

External links
 

2007 establishments in Texas
2007 sculptures
Bronze sculptures in Texas
Granite sculptures in Texas
Monuments and memorials in Texas
Outdoor sculptures in Austin, Texas
World War II memorials in the United States